Muna may refer to:

Places 

Muna (Mikulovice), a World War II POW camp and ammunition factory in the Czech Republic
Muna, Estonia, village in Rõuge Parish, Võru County, Estonia
Muna, Iran, village in East Azerbaijan Province, Iran
Muna, Nepal, village development committee, Myagdi District, Nepal
Muna, Saudi Arabia, neighborhood of Mecca in Makkah Province, Saudi Arabia
Muna, Yucatán, town in Yucatán, Mexico
Muna (Umba), river in Murmansk Oblast, Russia, tributary of the Umba
Muna (Lena) river in Yakutia, Russia, tributary of the Lena
Muna Island, an island in South East Sulawesi, Indonesia
Muna Regency, a regency in South East Sulawesi, Indonesia; covers part of the island of Muna and part of neighbouring Buton Island
West Muna Regency, a separate regency in South East Sulawesi, Indonesia; cut out of Muna Regency in 2014

People 
Muna people, Indonesia
Muna (name), a given name
Muna AbuSulayman (born 1973), Arab and Muslim media personality
Muna Handal-Dayeh (born 1957), Palestinian-American businesswoman, entrepreneur, and president of the Bethlehem Association
Muna Jabir Adam (born 1987), Sudanese athlete who specializes in the 400 metres hurdles
Muna Katupose (born 1988), Namibian football forward with Oshakati City F.C. and the Namibia national football team
Bernard Muna (born 1940), Cameroonian lawyer, magistrate and politician
Akere Muna, Cameroonian anti-corruption lawyer
Salomon Tandeng Muna (1912–2002), Cameroonian politician
Muna Durka (born 1988), Sudanese steeplechase runner
Muna Wassef (born 1942), Syrian stage, film and television actress
Muna (rapper) (born 1987), Nigerian rapper, songwriter and model
Muna (band), an American pop band

Other 
Muna (Markéta Irglová album)
Muna (Muna album)
 Muña (Minthostachys mollis), a medicinal plant from the South American Andes
 Muna (film), 2019 Nigerian film by Kevin Nwankwor
Muna (moth), a moth genus in the family Depressariidae
Kami nAPO Muna, the first tribute album in honour of the 1970s Filipino musical group, APO Hiking Society
Kiss Muna, (literally Kiss Me First), a weekly sitcom in the Philippines, with a dose of politics and sex as main staple, produced by GMA Network, Inc.
Muna Hotel, a hotel in Mogadishu, Somalia, located less than a mile from Somalia's presidential palace, as a noted conference centre
Muna Hotel attack, attacked by al-Shabaab fighters on 24 August 2010
Muna Madan, a short epic narrative by the Nepalese poet Laxmi Prasad Devkota and one of the most popular works in Nepali literature
Muna Moto, a 1975 drama film directed by Jean-Pierre Dikongué Pipa
Muna–Buton languages, a group of languages spoken on the islands of Muna and Buton off the coast of South East Sulawesi province, Indonesia

Muna language, an Austronesian language spoken principally on the island of Muna and the adjacent (northwestern) part of Buton Island

See also 
Muna Lee (disambiguation)
Anigre, a type of wood with a common name of Muna

Language and nationality disambiguation pages